West Kings District High School is a high-school located in Auburn, Kings County, Nova Scotia, Canada that was officially opened on Friday October 5, 1956 with a first years enrollment of 457. 
Current enrollment is 667 students.

Extracurricular activities

Activities that are offered at West Kings High School are diverse. Student council is a popular extracurricular that incorporates the following committees; Broadcast, Campus Store, Dance, Environmental, Fine Arts, Grad, Healthy Living, Spirit, TADD (Teens Against Drunk and Distracted Driving) and Yearbook. Athletics are also popular; at West Kings they are a division two school and offer co-ed football, hockey, volleyball, soccer, badminton, rugby, cross country, track and field, and basketball.

References

External links
 West Kings District High School

High schools in Nova Scotia